Bossk is a fictional character in the Star Wars franchise. First appearing in The Empire Strikes Back (1980), where he was portrayed by Alan Harris, he is a reptilian bounty hunter featured in the original trilogy. Bossk first appears in The Empire Strikes Back (1980), employed by the Galactic Empire.

The character also appears in many forms of Star Wars media outside of the films, such as books, comics, television series, and video games. Dee Bradley Baker voiced the role of Bossk in the animated series Star Wars: The Clone Wars.

Creation and development
In the fourth draft of The Empire Strikes Back, Bossk was written as a slimy, tentacled monster with two huge bloodshot eyes in a soft baggy face. The outfit used for the character was a High-Altitude Windak Pressure Suit used by the Royal Air Force in the 1960s and was recycled from the 1966 Doctor Who serial The Tenth Planet.

Appearances

Skywalker saga

Original trilogy

Bossk first appeared in The Empire Strikes Back on Darth Vader's flagship with five other bounty hunters. Vader tasks the bounty hunters with finding the Millennium Falcon, which Boba Fett accomplishes.

Bossk appeared again in Return of the Jedi, at Jabba the Hutt's palace on Tatooine with Fett.

Anthology films
Bossk is mentioned in Solo: A Star Wars Story, when Val complains to her husband Tobias Beckett about hiring Han Solo and Chewbacca instead of experienced mercenaries such as Bossk. In earlier drafts, Bossk was written in as a member of the Enfys Nest's Cloud Riders who abandons her at the end of movie. Screenwriter Jonathan Kasdan "fought long and hard" to include this in Solo but was overruled.

Promotion
Bossk has been featured in Hasbro, Lego Star Wars, and Funko toys.

References

External links
 
 

Extraterrestrial supervillains
Fictional bounty hunters
Fictional contract killers
Fictional characters with accelerated healing
Fictional reptiles
Film characters introduced in 1980
Male film villains
Star Wars Skywalker Saga characters
Villains in animated television series